Coston may refer to:

Places
Coston, Leicestershire
Coston, Norfolk

Other uses
Coston (surname)